was a Japanese aristocrat, poet and politician of the early Heian period. He was the fourth son of Sugawara no Kiyotomo.

Life 

Koreyoshi was said to be intelligent and wise from a young age, reading books and composing poetry before Emperor Saga from the age of 11.

In 845, he became a teacher in the Daigaku-ryō. While in this role, he also served as vice-governor of Echigo Province and Sanuki Province, and as a tutor to Crown Prince Michiyasu, the future Emperor Montoku.

Continuing his work as a teacher, he also worked as the head of the Daigaku-ryō, and governor of Kaga, Mimasaka, Ise, and Bizen provinces.

Passing through a number of other positions, including as director of the Gyōbu-shō, he was in 870 appointed as vice-minister of the Shikibu-shō. In 872, he joined the ranks of the kugyō with a promotion to sangi. In 880, Koreyoshi died at the age of 69.

Personality and works 

The foremost scholar of his day, he was said to be friendly with the master poet Ono no Takamura and the court Confucian scholars Harusumi no Yoshitada and Ōe no Otondo. He counted many good officials and Confucian writers as his disciples. He was unconcerned with the mundanities of everyday life, instead reciting poems on the beauty of nature. As a believer in Buddhist teachings, he treated people with love, exhibited extreme filial piety, and disliked killing. On his deathbed, he requested only that a Buddhist memorial service be held for him in the early winter when the ume blossomed, and otherwise spoke not a word.

As tutor to the Emperors Montoku and Seiwa, Koreyoshi lectured on the Wen Xuan and the Book of Han, and the imperial edicts and prayers he drew up as chief draftsman still remain today. With Miyako no Yoshika and others he compiled the Nihon Montoku Tennō Jitsuroku.

Genealogy 

Father: Sugawara no Kiyotomo
Mother: Unknown
Wife: third daughter of 
Son: 
Son: 
Son: 
Other children:
Daughter: , wife of Emperor Kōkō, mother of

Notes

References 

812 births
880 deaths
9th-century Japanese poets
Japanese politicians
People of Heian-period Japan